{{DISPLAYTITLE:NZR WG class}}

The NZR WG class was a development of the preceding WF class of all purpose tank locomotive. Later in their careers most (14) were rebuilt as WW class. The locomotives were designed by A. L. Beattie, who described them as a "large tank locomotive."

In service 
The locomotives were used on suburban trains in Wellington and Auckland.

Rimutaka Incline 

 

WG 480 was built by New Zealand Railways at Hillside (maker's no 104/10), went into service in October 1910. It was altered for use on the Rimutaka Incline to assist the "Fell" locomotives cope with the military traffic to and from the New Zealand Expeditionary Forces training camp at Featherston. The cowcatchers were altered to clear the high Fell centre rail, and it had an acetylene headlamp arranged to follow the alignment of the track on curves. Written off in June 1969, and preserved at Glenbrook.

Withdrawals 
All of the locomotives were withdrawn by 1956.

See also
 NZR W class
 NZR WA class
 NZR WB class
 NZR WD class
 NZR WE class
 NZR WF class
 NZR WW class
 NZR WS / WAB class
 Locomotives of New Zealand

References

Bibliography 

WG class
Scrapped locomotives
Railway locomotives introduced in 1910